Korokī Te Rata Mahuta Tāwhiao Pōtatau Te Wherowhero (16 June 1906 – 18 May 1966) was the fifth Māori King. He was the elder son of the fourth Māori King, Te Rata Mahuta, and Te Uranga Matai of the Ngāti Korokī tribe. He was named Korokī after the ancestor of his mother's tribe.

Biography 
Korokī was born at Waahi, Huntly, on 16 June 1906. He had a younger brother Taipu, who died in 1924, shortly after arriving at Wesley College.

Korokī had a relationship with Te Paea Raihe, probably in the 1920s, and they had two daughters. In about 1930 Te Puea Herangi arranged for him to marry her niece Te Atairangikaahu, the daughter of her brother Wanakore Herangi. Te Atairangikaahu had a daughter, Piki, born in 1931. They adopted a son, Robert Mahuta, in 1939. Korokī and his family lived at Waahi.

Korokī's father died on 1 October 1933, when Korokī was just 24. He was chosen to succeed his father as king and accepted reluctantly. He was crowned on 8 October 1933, the day of his father's funeral.

In his first few years as king, he was closely supervised by his father's brothers Tumate and Tonga Mahuta, and Haunui Tawhiao, brother of his grandfather King Mahuta. Two of his main confidants and supporters were Pei Te Hurinui Jones and Piri Poutapu. In 1953, he was awarded the Queen Elizabeth II Coronation Medal. On 30 December 1953 he received Queen Elizabeth II when she called at his official residence at Tūrangawaewae marae at Ngāruawāhia during the coronation tour.

He died at Ngāruawāhia on 18 May 1966 and was buried on Mount Taupiri on 23 May. He was succeeded by Piki, who was given her mother's name of Te Atairangikaahu at her coronation.

References

Māori monarchs
1906 births
1966 deaths
Ngāti Mahuta people
Waikato Tainui people
People from Huntly, New Zealand